Metachanda louvelella is a moth species in the oecophorine tribe Metachandini. It was described by Pierre Viette in 1956.

References

Oecophorinae
Moths described in 1956
Taxa named by Pierre Viette